Ibn Sukkara (died 15 May 995) was a poet from Baghdad, who was active during the Buyid era. He is noted for his satirical verses. According to al-Tha'alibi (died 1038), Ibn Sukkara's diwan (collection of short poems) consisted of no less than 50,000 verses. However, it has not survived.

Ibn Sukkara's biggest supporter was the Buyid vizier Abu Muhammad al-Hasan al-Muhallabi (died 963).

References

Sources 
 

Buyid-period poets
995 deaths
People from Baghdad